Oakland International Airport station is a Bay Area Rapid Transit (BART) station on the Beige Line in Oakland, California, serving the Oakland International Airport (OAK). This station is on the system's Automated Guideway Transit (AGT) spur line, which carries passengers between the airport and Coliseum station.

The station opened on November 22, 2014. Unlike the former AirBART shuttle bus system it replaced, the Oakland Airport Connector system is fully integrated into the BART fare system, including the acceptance of Clipper cards. All ticketing machines and faregates for the line are at Coliseum station; no fare equipment is present at this station.

References

External links 

BART — Oakland Int'l Airport Station Overview

Station
Stations on the Beige Line (BART)
Railway stations in the United States opened in 2014
Bay Area Rapid Transit stations in Alameda County, California
Airport railway stations in the United States
2014 establishments in California
Railway stations in Oakland, California
Transit centers in the United States